Johannes Ussing (2 December 1883 – 13 March 1929) was a Danish modern pentathlete. He competed at the 1912 Summer Olympics.

References

1883 births
1929 deaths
Danish male modern pentathletes
Olympic modern pentathletes of Denmark
Modern pentathletes at the 1912 Summer Olympics
Sportspeople from Aarhus